Zounds is the third album by Australian rock band Dappled Cities, released in Australia on 15 August 2009 and worldwide on 15 September through Dangerbird Records.  The album comes two years after their previous release, Granddance, during which time the band was touring the US with the likes of The Fratellis and Tokyo Police Club, with a few forays home riding shotgun to Silverchair, Modest Mouse and LCD Soundsystem. At this point, the band had uprooted from their home of Sydney and settled Stateside. They shot videos in Wyoming gas stations, played impromptu gigs in South Dakota sound factories, partied with Hugh Jackman and Steve Malkmus and even managed to film a 26-episode children's odyssey for Disney called ‘Alphabreaks’.

Under the expert A&R guidance of Justin Meldal-Johnsen (Beck, Ladytron, Nine Inch Nails) and respected American co-producer Chris Coady (TV on the Radio), Dappled Cities got busy making music.  The band spared no expense, using new-fangled electric guitars and importing a Gakken — a $40 build-it-yourself cardboard synthesiser from Japan — used on all 12 songs. Their drive to succeed saw them hire and conspire with no less than three mixers for Zounds — Coady, Scott Horscroft and Wayne Connolly — in the quest for perfection.  The result: "It's an album that really shows the growth and depth of Dappled Cities. Zounds is both grand and emotive and full of euphoric melodies and unique story-telling."

Track listing
(All songs written, arranged and performed by Dappled Cities)
 "Hold Your Back" – 4:46
 "Answer Is Zero" – 3:54
 "The Price" – 4:33
 "Wooden Ships" – 4:59
 "Slow for Me, My Island" – 4:44
 "The Night Is Young at Heart" – 5:24
 "Miniature Alas" – 4:35
 "Don't Stop There" – 3:51
 "Kid" – 4:29
 "Middle People" – 4:20
 "Apart" – 4:48
 "Stepshadows" – 5:27

iTunes bonus track version
 "Fire Fire Fire" (Live Performance)
 "Beach Song" (Live Performance)
 "Grandance" (Live Performance)
 "Peach Song" (Live Performance)

Personnel

Musicians
Dappled Cities
Ned Cooke
Tim Derricourt
Allan Kumpulainen
Alex Moore
David Rennick

Others:
Alex Love – French Horn
Madeleine Hawcroft – Flute
Sebastian Ranguis, Des Miller, Kim Waldock, Ned Cooke – Strings

Other Personnel
Produced by: Chris Coady and Dappled Cities
Engineered by: Simon Berckelman
Assistant Engineered by: Jean-Paul Fung 
Mixed by: Chris Coady ("Hold Your Back", "The Night Is Young At Heart", "Don't Stop There", "Middle People", "Apart", "Stepshadows"), Wayne Connolly ("The Price", "Slow For Me, My Island", "Miniature Alas", "Don't Stop There"), Scott Horscroft ("Answer Is Zero", "Wooden Ships", "Slow For Me, My Island", "Middle People"), Dappled Cities
Mastered by: Louie Teran
A&R by: Justin Meldal-Johnsen
Dangerbird Records: Jeff Castelaz, Peter Walker
Design by: Tim Rogers
Photography by: Wilk

Reviews
The Vine – "Trying to dissect Dappled Cities is a bit like trying to pin down a mirage. On the one hand, the Sydney band has some very identifiable characteristics: Flaming Lips-worthy psychedelia, ’80s-style synth-pop, and chipper post/disco-punk (cue the hi-hats). On the other hands, no one else really sounds like them, and their albums are so soupy with effects that it’s easy to get lost in the mirror maze of it all. Following 2006’s sophomore effort, Granddance, which saw the five-piece focus more on a shot at success in the States, the long-gestating Zounds is similarly likeable yet unwieldy."

StarPulse.com – "The third release from Dappled Cities finds the Australian quartet continuing to develop its strangely retro-futuristic sound, one that blends cheesy sonics (all tracks on Zounds feature the Gakken, a 40 cardboard synthesizer from Japan) with self-consciously uneven vocals and moments of sheer, glistening pop transcendence... The bag is definitely mixed, but the balance ends up positive." (Rating: 2.5 stars) 

Pitchfork.com – "Dappled Cities haven't quite acquired a big reputation outside their homeland yet, but it seems likely they will. If they keep making big, boisterous records like this that are unafraid to be a little ridiculous in places, they'll have to." (Rating: 7.8/10) 

FasterLouder.com – "Dappled Cities have crafted an LP that explores new emotional ground, while taking in a whole new set of inspired musical choices.... When Zounds is judged on its own terms, what stands out is the emotional depth. Suddenly, the pop stereotypes associated with Shins-esque twee or accessible electronica like Animal Collective have disappeared. In its place is a sense of maturity and direction.... Zounds is the perfect example of a band taking what’s great about their sound and value-adding until it offers a whole new experience. After their excellent work on Granddance, Dappled Cities have given us something even greater with Zounds."

C.O.T.M.A.! (blog) – "Dappled Cities offers a full, rich album, lined with pastiche and filled out with big, bombastic detail. The band makes no apologies about jumping into that muddy area between electropop and indie rock that so many bands have explored--terrain charted by Of Montreal, Cut Copy, and innumerable artists. Zounds makes a conscious effort to fill every second of every song with sound; where there is no instrument playing, there is an echo of one.... Zounds is as artistic as it is a serious indie album, defying ownership both by pretentious hipsters and pop aficionados.... This is art. True enough, the mix of buzzing, whirring, gurgling, and thumping that starts the recording with "Hold Your Back" establishes the new and improved Dappled Cities as an Of-Montreal-cum-Animal-Collective-cum-Shins amalgamation that just wants to blow your mind, not with wacky exuberance or springy lyrics but with a complete tonal invention, combing through the lessons alternative music learned in the last 20 years and making notes about each of them. Each song is a synthesizer-driven indie rock song, dressed in the trimmings of that wholesome indie style—multi-instrumental, full, busy but not fabricated."

References

External links
Dappled Cities Official Website
Dangerbird Records - Zounds - Album Release Information
Zounds on Rdio
Zounds on Spotify

Dappled Cities Fly albums
2009 albums